Marathi literature is the body of literature of Marathi, an Indo-Aryan language spoken mainly in the Indian state of Maharashtra and written in the Devanagari and Modi script.

History

Ancient Era 
Maharashtri Prakrit was the southern Prakrit that was spoken in the banks of Narmada and Godavari. Maharashtri was an offshoot of Vedic Sanskrit. 
The earliest example of Maharashtri as a separate language dates to approximately 3rd century BCE: a stone inscription found in a cave at Naneghat, Junnar in Pune district had been written in Maharashtri using Brahmi script. A committee appointed by the Maharashtra State Government to get the Classical status for Marathi has claimed that Marathi existed at least 2300 years ago. Marathi, a derivative of Maharashtri, is probably first attested in a 739 CE copper-plate inscription found in Satara. Several inscriptions dated to the second half of the 11th century feature Marathi, which is usually appended to Sanskrit or prakrit in these inscriptions. The earliest Marathi-only inscriptions are the ones issued during the Shilahara rule, including a c. 1012 CE stone inscription from Akshi taluka of Raigad district, and a 1060 or 1086 CE copper-plate inscription from Dive that records a land grant (agrahara) to a Brahmin. A 2-line 1118 CE Marathi inscription at Shravanabelagola records a grant by the Hoysalas. These inscriptions suggest that Marathi was a standard written language by the 12th century. However, there is no record of any actual literature produced in Marathi until the late 13th century.

Yadava period 

Epigraphic evidence suggests that Marathi was a standard written language by the 12th century. However, the earliest records of actual literature in Marathi appear only in the late 13th century. The early Marathi literature emerged during the Seuna (Yadava) rule, because of which some scholars have theorized that it was produced with support from the Yadava rulers. The Yadavas did regard Marathi as a significant language for connecting with the general public, and Marathi replaced Kannada and Sanskrit as the dominant language of the inscriptions during the last half century of the Yadava rule. However, there is no evidence that the Yadava royal court directly supported the production of Marathi literature with state funds.

The early Marathi literature was mostly religious and philosophical in nature, and was composed by the saint-poets belonging to Mahanubhava and Warkari sects. During the reign of the last three Yadava kings, a great deal of literature in verse and prose, on astrology, medicine, Puranas, Vedanta, kings and courtiers were created. Nalopakhyana, Rukminiswayamvara and Shripati's Jyotisharatnamala (1039) are a few examples.

Bhaskarabhatta Borikar of the Mahanubhava sect is the first known poet to have composed hymns in Marathi.

Dnyaneshwar (1275–1296) was the first Marathi literary figure who had wide readership and profound influence. His major works are Amrutanubhav and Bhavarth Deepika (popularly known as Dnyaneshwari). Bhavarth Deepika is a 9000-couplets long commentary on the Bhagavad Gita.

Namdev, the  Bhakti saint and contemporary of Dnyaneshwar is the other significant literary figure from this era. Namdev composed religious songs in Marathi as well as Hindi; some of his Hindi compositions are included in the Sikh holy book, the Guru Granth Sahib.

Another early Marathi writer was Mukundaraja, who wrote Vivekasindhu and Paramamrita. Both the works deal with the Advaita philosophy. Some earlier scholars dated him to the 12th century, and considered Vivekasindhu as the first literary book in Marathi, dating it to 1188. However, most linguistic historians now date Mukundaraja to 14th century or later: the Vivekasindhu was likely written after Lilacharita and Dnyaneshwari.

Deccan Sultanates period 

There was relatively little activity in Marathi in the early days of the Bahmani Sultanate (1347–1527) and the Bijapur Sultanate (1527–1686). The Warkari saint-poet Eknath (1533–1599), the main successor of Dnyaneshwar, was a major Marathi literary figure during this period. He made available an authentic, edited version of Dnyaneshwari, which had been forgotten after the Islamic invasion of Deccan. He also wrote several abhangs (devotional poems), narratives and minor works that dealt with the Bhagavata Purana  He wrote Eknathi Bhagwat, Bhavarth Ramayan, Rukmini Swayamwar Hastamalak, and Bharud. Dasopant was another minor but notable poet from this era. Mukteshwar (1574-1645), the grandson of Eknath, too, wrote several works in Marathi including a translation of the epic Mahabharata.

Krista Purana, written by the Goa-based Christian missionary Thomas Stephens, was first published in 1616. It is written in a mix of Marathi and Konkani languages, and the first copy was printed in the Roman script, and tells the story of Jesus Christ.

Maratha period 

The Marathas, the Marathi-speaking natives, formed their own kingdom under the leadership of  Shivaji Maharaj in the 17th century. The development of the Marathi literature accelerated during this period. Tukaram and Samarth Ramdas, who were contemporaries of Shivaji, were the well-known poets of the early Maratha period. Tukaram (1608–1650) was the most prominent Marathi Varkari spiritual poet identified with the Bhakti movement, and had a great influence on the later Maratha society. His contemporary, Samarth Ramdas composed Dasbodh and Manache Shlok in Marathi.

In the 18th century, several well-known works like Yatharthadeepika (by Vaman Pandit), Naladamayanti Swayamvara (by Raghunath Pandit), Pandava Pratap, Harivijay, Ramvijay (by Shridhar Pandit) and Mahabharata (translation by Moropant) were produced. The historical section of the old Marathi literature contained the Bakhars and the Katavas. Krishna Dayarnava and Sridhar were other leading poets during the Peshwa rule. Mahipati, the author who wrote the biographies of the Bhakti Saints also belonged to this era.

British Period 

The British colonial period (also known as the Modern Period)  saw standardisation of Marathi grammar through the efforts of the Christian missionary William Carey. Carey's dictionary had fewer entries and Marathi words were in Devanagari script instead of the Modi script prevalent at that time. Carey also translated the new and old testament of the bible into Marathi in 1811 and 1820 respectively.  The most comprehensive Marathi-English dictionaries was compiled by Captain James Thomas Molesworth and Major Thomas Candy in 1831. The book is still in print nearly two centuries after its publication.
The colonial authorities also worked on standardizing Marathi under the leadership of Molesworth. They used Brahmins of Pune for this task and adopted the Sanskrit dominated dialect spoken by this caste in the city as the standard dialect for Marathi.
The Christian missionaries introduced the Western forms to the Marathi literature. 

Marathi at this time was efficiently aided by Marathi Drama. Here, there also was a different genre called 'Sangit Natya' or Musicals. The first play was V.A. Bhave's Sita Swayamvar in 1843. Later Kirloskar (1843–85) and G.B. Deval (1854-1916) brought a romantic aroma and social content. But Krishnaji Prabhakar Khadilkar (1872-1948) with his banned play Kichaka-Vadh (1910) set the trend of political playwriting. These were followed by stalwarts like Ram Ganesh Gadkari and Prahlad Keshav Atre.

The modern poets like Keshavsuta, Balakavi, Govindagraj, and the poets of Ravi Kiran Mandal (such as Madhav Julian) wrote poetry which was influenced by the Romantic and Victorian English poetry. It was largely sentimental and lyrical. Prahlad Keshav Atre, the renowned satirist and a politician wrote a parody of this sort of poetry in his collection Jhenduchi Phule.

Sane Guruji (1899–1950) contributed to the children's literature in Marathi. His major works are Shyamchi Aai, AstikandGode Shevata. He translated and simplified many Western Classics and published them in a book of stories titled Gode Goshti (Sweet Stories).

Beginning of journalism 

On January 6, 1832, Balshastri Jambhekar of the Elphinstone College began Darpan, the first Marathi-English fortnightly magazine.

On 24 October 1841, Govind Vithal Kunte began Prabhakar. Kunte was the first professional Marathi journalist. Prabhakar eulogised Indian art and culture. American missionaries started a marathi magazine called Dnyanodaya in 1842 which denigrated Hindu religion but also had articles related to science and technology. The magazine is still in print today. Jnyan Prakash was started on 12 February 1849 in Pune. In its early years, It was edited by Krishnaraj Trimbak Ranade. It was published weekly till 1904, when it became a daily. It ceased publication in 1951.The journal advocated education and social reform. Hari Narayan Apte, a popular Marathi novelist also served as its editor. Some of its contributors included Mahadev Govind Ranade and Gopal Krishna Gokhale.In 1862, Induprakash, a bilingual journal, was founded in Bombay. It was  edited by M.G. Ranade.It criticised orthodoxy in hinduism and called for social reforms. In 1877, Jyotiba Phule and Krishnarao Bhaskar began Deenbandhu, as part of the Dalit upliftment movement. Deenabandhu was the organ of the Satyashodhak Samaj founded by Phule. Other notable early Marathi periodicals include Jaganmitra (from Ratnagiri), Shubh Suchak (from Satara), Vartaman Dipika, and Vartaman Sangrah.

On 4 January 1881, Bal Gangadhar Tilak began Kesari, along with Gopal Ganesh Agarkar. In 1887, Agarkar left to start sujeet Sudharak (bilingual) along with Gopal Krishna Gokhale. After Agarkar's death in 1895, it ceased publication. In 1889, K. Navalkar started the weekly Vartahar to highlight atrocities committed by the ruling British and other Europeans. In 1890, Hari Narayan Apte began Karmanuk, a family entertainment paper. It contained articles on science. Also in 1890, Anandrao Ramachandra Dharandhar started Bhoot published every new and full moon day. It was the first Marathi paper to carry cartoons on political and social matters. It was very popular but ceased publication in 1904.

Present times (1947- till now )

Vishnu Sakharam Khandekar (1889–1976)'s Yayati won him the Jnanpith Award for 1975. He also wrote many other novels, short stories, essays etc. His major works are Don Dhruv (Two Poles), Ulka (Meteorite), Krounchavadh, Jalalela Mohar, Amrutvel.

Marathi drama flourished in the 1960s and 1970s, with literary figures like Vasant Kanetkar, Kusumagraj and Vijay Tendulkar.

The major paradigm shift  in Marathi literature sensibilities  began in the forties with the  modernist poetry of B.S. Mardhekar. In the mid fifties, the little magazine movement gained momentum. It published writings which were non-conformist, radical and experimental. Dalit literary movement also gained strength due to the little magazine movement. This radical movement was influenced by the philosophy of Babasaheb Ambedkar and challenged the literary establishment which was largely middle class, urban, and upper caste people. The little magazine movement threw up many noted writers. Bhalchandra Nemade is a well-known novelist, critic and poet. Sharad Rane is a well-known child literary figure. The notable poets include Arun Kolatkar, Dilip Chitre, Namdeo Dhasal, Vasant Abaji Dahake and Manohar Oak. Bhau Padhye, Vilas Sarang, Shyam Manohar, Suhas Shirvalkar and Visharm Bedekar are well known fiction writers.

Another major shift sensibility began in the nineties with the poems and criticism of Shridhar Tilve and  the  poetry of poets associated with Saushthav, Abhidhanantar and Shabadavedh. In the post nineties, this 'new little magazine movement' gained momentum and poets like Shridhar Tilve who stood against postmodernism and nativism and poets like Manya Joshi, Hemant Divate, Sachin Ketkar, Mangesh Narayanrao Kale, Saleel Wagh, Mohan Borse, Nitin Kulkarni, Nitin Arun Kulkarni, Varjesh Solanki,  Sandeep Deshpande, Vasant Gurjar who touched the new areas of post-modern life. The poetry collections brought out by Abhidhanantar Prakashan, Time and Space, Popular Prakashan, Navta Prakashan and the regular issues of the magazine Abhidhanantar and IRREGULAR issues of Saushthav, Shabdvedh are taking Marathi poetry to the global standards. Another leading wave in contemporary Marathi poetry is the poetry of new dalit wave poets like Arun Kale, Bhujang Meshram and new deshi wave poets like Pravin Bandekar, Shrikant Deshmukh and Veerdhaval Parab.

Science fiction 
Marathi science fiction has a rich heritage and a wide enthusiastic readership. In the early 20th century, Marathi science fiction work was more aligned to fantasy. After 1950, several writers started translating classic English science fiction literature and also contributed independent work.

The modern Marathi science fiction took off after technology started playing a major role in providing a rich context for speculating about the future. From 1975, modern Marathi science fiction has been regularly published in mainstream magazines and also in publications devoted to science and technology.

Marathi Vidnyan Parishad has been consistently at the forefront for modern Marathi science fiction, contributing through multiple channels – publications, translations, critique, writing workshops, and its annual science fiction competition. Many modern writers have emerged from this prestigious competition running uninterrupted since 1970.The first wave of writers includes B R Bhagwat, D P Khambete, Narayan Dharap, D B Mokhashi, Gajanan Kshirsagar, and Yashawant Ranjankar. The modern writers are: Jayant Narlikar, Bal Phondke, Niranajan Ghate, Lakshman Londhe, Subodh Jawdekar, Arun Mande, Madhuri Shanbhag, Shubhada Gogate, Sanjay Dhole, D V Kulkarni, Arun Sadhu, Meghashri Dalvi, Sudha Risbud, Smita Potnis, Prasanna Karandikar, Ashish Mahabal, D V Jahagirdar, Yashawant Deshpande.

Encyclopedia 
Over the last century or so, a number of  producing encyclopedias have been produced in marathi. These include . Shreedhar Venkatesh Ketkar's 'Dnyaankosh', Siddheshwarshastri Chitrao's 'Charitra Kosh', Mahadevshastri Joshi's 'Bharatiy Sanskrutikosh', and Laxmanshastri Joshi's 'Dharmakosh' and 'Marathi Vishwakosh'.

Dalit Literature 

Baburao Bagul (1930–2008) was a pioneer of Dalit writings in Marathi. His first collection of stories, Jevha Mi Jat Chorali (जेव्हा मी जात चोरली) (When I Concealed My Caste), published in 1963, created a stir in Marathi literature with its passionate depiction of a cruel society and thus brought in new momentum to Dalit literature in Marathi. Gradually with other writers like, Namdeo Dhasal (who founded Dalit Panther), these Dalit writings paved way for the strengthening of Dalit movement. Notable Dalit authors writing in Marathi include Arun Kamble, Shantabai Kamble, Raja Dhale, Namdev Dhasal, Daya Pawar, Annabhau Sathe, Laxman Mane, Laxman Gaikwad, Sharankumar Limbale,   Bhau Panchbhai,  Kishor Shantabai Kale, Narendra Jadhav, and  Urmila Pawar.

Awards 
Four Marathi writers have been honored with the Jnanpith Award:

 Vishnu Sakharam Khandekar
 Vishnu Vaman Shirwadkar (Kusumagraj)
 Vinda Karandikar
 Bhalchandra Nemade

Every year, Sahitya Akademi gives the Sahitya Akademi Award to Marathi writers for their outstanding contribution to Marathi literature. See the List of Sahitya Akademi Award winners for Marathi.

See also 

 Geet Ramayan
 Marathi people
 Marathi Christians
 Marathi Buddhists
 List of Marathi-language authors

Notes

References

Bibliography 
 
  (PDF form)

External links 

Marathi Literature in the Twenty-first Century: An Overview
A Brief Introduction to New Marathi Poetry on Poetry International Web
Globalization and New Marathi Poetry
Devotional Aartis of Maharashtra
Marathi Poetry in the Early Twentieth Century
Marathi Literature of Maharashtra
Contemporary Marathi Writers
Sachin Ketkar's article on Brief History of Marathi poetry in past one hundred years
Longest Marathi Poem “Aani Maza Buddha Bolala” 2000+ Line World Records India by Prof.Jyoti Dhondiram Pandit (Dhutmal)

Indian literature by language

Indian literature
Literature by language
Maharashtra